{{Taxobox 
| name = Spicara maena
| image = Spicara maena male spawning.jpg
| image_width = 
| image_caption = Blotched picarel male spawning
| status = LC 
| status_system = IUCN3.1
| status_ref = 
| regnum = Animalia
| phylum = Chordata
| classis = Actinopterygii
| ordo = Perciformes
| familia = Sparidae
| genus = Spicara
| species = S. maena
| binomial = Spicara maena
| binomial_authority = (Linnaeus, 1758)
| synonyms = *Maena chryselis (Valenciennes, 1830)Maena jusculum Cuvier, 1829Maena maena (Linnaeus, 1758)Maena osbechii Valenciennes, 1830Maena osbeckii Valenciennes, 1830Maena vomerina Valenciennes, 1830Maena vulgaris Valenciennes, 1830Merolepis chryselis (Valenciennes, 1830)Merolepis maena (Linnaeus, 1758)Smaris cagarella Cuvier, 1829Smaris chryselis Valenciennes, 1830Smaris gagarella Valenciennes, 1830Smaris maena (Linnaeus, 1758)Sparus maena Linnaeus, 1758Sparus osbeck Lacepède, 1802Sparus tricuspidatus Spinola, 1807Sparus zebra Brünnich, 1768Spicara chryselis (Valenciennes, 1830)Spicara maena maena (Linnaeus, 1758) 
| synonyms_ref = 
}}Spicara maena, the blotched picarel, is a species of ray-finned fish native to the eastern Atlantic Ocean, the Mediterranean Sea and the Black Sea. This fish is fished commercially in some areas.

Genetic studies have confirmed that Spicara flexuosa is a separate species, not a synonym for Spicara maenaImsiridou A., Minos G., Gakopoulou A., Katsares V., Karidas T., Katselis G. Discrimination of two picarel species Spicara flexuosa and Spicara maena (Pisces: Centracanthidae) based on mitochondrial DNA sequences (англ.) // J. Fish Biol.. — 2011. — Vol. 78, no. 1. — P. 373—377. — DOI:10.1111/j.1095-8649.2010.02858.x

The upper jaw is protrusible and the mouth contains several rows of small teeth. The single dorsal fin has eleven spines and twelve soft rays and the anal fin has three spines and nine or ten soft rays. There are sixty-eight to seventy scales on the lateral line. This fish is blue-grey above with silvery sides and a scattering of small dark spots. There is usually one large dark blotch above the tip of the pectoral fin. Spicara maena is a rather variable species. It has many synonyms across its wide range and is often confused with the common picarel Spicara smaris.

Distribution and habitatSpicara maena is found in the Eastern Atlantic, the Mediterranean Sea and the Black Sea. Its Atlantic range extends from Morocco and the Canary Islands northwards to Portugal. It lives near the seabed over sandy and muddy bottoms and in seagrass (Posidonia oceanica) meadows.

BiologySpicara maena'' is a gregarious fish that moves in schools and feeds on small benthic invertebrates  and  zooplankton. It is a protogynous hermaphrodite, starting life as a female and later changing into a male. The females become mature at the age of two years and spawning takes place between March and June in the Aegean, and between August and October further west in the Mediterranean. The male digs a hollow on the seabed and the female lays eggs with a sticky surface in this nest.

References

External links
 
 
 

Sparidae
Fish described in 1758
Taxa named by Carl Linnaeus